María Oralia Vega Ortíz (born 13 September 1963) is a Mexican politician affiliated with the Institutional Revolutionary Party. As of 2014 he served as Deputy of the LX Legislature of the Mexican Congress representing Hidalgo.

References

1963 births
Living people
People from Pachuca
Institutional Revolutionary Party politicians
21st-century Mexican politicians
Deputies of the LX Legislature of Mexico
Members of the Chamber of Deputies (Mexico) for Hidalgo (state)